Five O'Clock Shadow is an a cappella group from Boston, Massachusetts, that has been in existence since 1991. The band has performed on FOX News, A&E Network, ABC, ESPN and VH-1's "breakthrough" series. They have released four cassettes and six CDs, winning many Contemporary A Cappella Recording Awards.

The group has toured with many famous acts including The Boston Pops, Aaron Neville, Edwin McCain, Patti LaBelle, Kool and the Gang, Blessed Union of Souls and James Brown.

Current members
 Dan Lennon - tenor (1995–present)
 Paul Pampinella - baritone (1998–present)
 Caleb Whelden - tenor (2003–present)
 Judd Tomaselli - bass (2012–present)
 Scott Cobban - vocal percussion/beatbox, baritone (2012–present)
 Jon Lavalley - tenor (2022–present)

Former members
Former members include
 Jim Meyers - tenor, founder (1991-1992)
 Bill Eddy - tenor (1991-2000)
 Jeff Thacher - tenor/vocal percussion (1991-1993), currently with the vocal band Rockapella
 Warren Tessier - baritone (1991-1997)
 Terry Sanger - bass (1991-1993)
 Dave Harrison - baritone/vocal banjo (1993-1997)
 Mike Mendyke - bass (1993-1998), currently with the vocal band Dick Van Dyke and The Vantastix
 Wes Carroll - tenor/vocal percussion (1993-1997)
 Scott Harris - baritone (1997)
 Mike Barnicle - tenor (2001-2003)
 Steve Roslonek - tenor (1997-1998), currently performs children's music as SteveSongs
 Roopak Ahuja - tenor (2000-2001), currently with the vocal band MO5AIC
 Samrat Chakrabarti - vocal percussion (1997-1998)
 David "Stack" Stackhouse - vocal percussion & vocal bass ("beatbass") (1998-2012)
 Oren Malka - tenor (1997-2021)

Member Timeline

Discography

External links
 Five O'Clock Shadow website

American vocal groups
Musical groups established in 1991
1991 establishments in Massachusetts